Borselan (also Romanized as Borselān; also known as Borselān-e ‘Olyā) is a village in Dughayi Rural District, in the Central District of Quchan County, Razavi Khorasan Province, Iran. At the 2006 census, its population was 391, in 110 families.

References 

Populated places in Quchan County